Borneo traditional tattooing is a hand tapping style of tattooing with two sticks, developed by some of the ancient tribes of Borneo.

Borneo tattooing designs
The most common of Borneo designs are thick black tribal work, which all have different meanings. 

Nature is the main focus when designing a traditional Bornean tattooing such as leaves, animals, fruits, trees and branches.

Tattoos

When a young man returns from a successful sojourn (bejalai), he can get a full body tattoo (kalingai or pantang) from a tattoo master who will design the overall design using outline first followed by blackening. The ink will be mixed with various protective charms and motives. The tattoo initiation ceremony is started by giving offerings to deities, thanking and requesting for more assistance and protection in subsequent activities.   

The Bungai Terung, which translates to the eggplant Borneo flower, is the first tattoo an Iban individual would receive. The Bungai Terung is a tattoo which marks the Iban tradition known as Bejalai (a journey of knowledge and wisdom), where an individual would leave their longhouse to experience the world. The tattoo is located on the front of the shoulder (never the chest) to show where ones bag straps lie, to prepare the individual to carry the weight of their own world (passage of a person into adulthood). The Bungai Terung has a spiral at the center of the eggplant flower the Tali Nyawa, which means the rope of life and is identical to the underside of a tadpole which symbolizes the beginning of a new life.

All the tattoos, following the eggplant flower, are like a diary. A young male would go out on his own to find knowledge and from each place he went to he would get one tattoo to mark not only where he is from but also where he has been. From each place the tattoos have different styles so the regional differences in his tattoos would tell the story of his journeys in life. If the boy received his Ampallang piercing, the Bungai Terung would be tattooed in his groin region to let others know he had passed that rite of passage.

Borneo tattoos do not just mark physical journeys. Some represent big life events, such as fathering  children etc. For example, there is a tattoo a man can have done on his hand called the Entegulun. You can only have this if you have taken heads. Most tattoos are for protection, for example the tattoos on the throat (pantang rekong) are meant to give strength to the skin on the throat, to stop the bearer's enemies from being able to sever the bearer's head. Males and females of high status would get the throat tattooed. It symbolizes an individual who is highly accomplished in a field of their life; e.g. a warrior who has taken many heads, or a great shaman, or a headman of a longhouse, or a great carver or artist, etc.   The tattoos on the back (Ketam Itit/Ketupong) represent the back of the crab, the tattoos on the arms (ketam lengan) represent the arms of the crab. A crab's shell is a hard armor, which protects its wearer.

The elephant (gajah) design motive is tattooed on the man's ribs to protect his sides from ripping. The thighs are also tattooed. The calves are tattooed with a fishing hook (mata ginti) or anchor (sauh).

Borneo tattooing today
Many of the designs no longer exist. In the 1950s & 1960s largely due to Christian missionaries, most of Borneo converted to Christianity and hence most tattooists assimilated and there was a sharp decline in the amount of practicing traditional Borneo tattoo artists. 
Roughly 10 years ago there was a resurgence in interest and culture when swarms of journalists and researchers came and surveyed on the traditional Borneo tattoos. This led to the tattoos becoming a Borneo pop culture phenomenon especially towards younger demographics.

See also 
Tattoo

 History of tattooing

Austronesian traditions:

 Batok (Philippines)
 Peʻa (Samoa)
 Marquesan
 Tā moko (Maori)

Other traditions:

 Yantra (Thailand, Cambodia, Laos, Myanmar)
 Tattooing in Myanmar
 Irezumi (Japan)
 Deq (Kurdish)
 Sicanje (Bosnia & Herzegovina)
 Sailor tattoos (Europe & Americas)

References

External links
 Borneo International Tattoo Convention

Borneo
Tattooing traditions